Vincenzo Fontana (born 16 April 1952, in Agrigento) is an Italian politician and deputy for Agrigento.

References

1952 births
Living people
Place of birth missing (living people)
Presidents of the Province of Agrigento